Timothy Matthew Hayward (born 9 July 1963 in Bristol) is a British food writer, broadcaster and restaurateur.

Career 

Born in Bristol, Hayward was educated at Bristol Grammar School, New College School, and Bournemouth School. He later attended the Bournemouth and Poole College of Art and Design. He is an ordained minister of the Universal Life Church though he does not use his title of Rev. Dr.

He has published several books including Food DIY (2012) and Knife: The Cult, Craft and Culture of the Cook's Knife (2016) which has now been translated into 8 languages. He is a regular panellist on BBC Radio 4’s The Kitchen Cabinet and has also written and presented several radio documentaries, including the 5-part Gut Instinct (2018) and Fungi: The New Frontier (2022). He is restaurant critic of the FT Magazine, the Financial Times Weekend supplement.

Hayward lives in Cambridge where, with his wife Alison Wright, he is proprietor of Fitzbillies, a hundred-year-old bakery, café and local institution.

In November 2020, he was admitted to Addenbrooke's Hospital with COVID-19, subsequently requiring treatment using a ventilator and suffering a pulmonary embolism. He was discharged after a month, having spent 14 days in a coma, and later described himself as "lucky to have lived."

Publications
 2011–2014 Fire & Knives – Food Quarterly. (Editor)
 2013 Food DIY: How to Make Your Own Everything
 2015 The DIY Cook
 2016 Knife: The Cult, Craft and Culture of the Cook's Knife
 2017 The Modern Kitchen: Objects That Changed the Way We Cook, Eat and Live
 2019 Fitzbillies: Stories and Recipes from a 100-year-old Cambridge Bakery (with Alison Wright)
 2021 Loaf Story: A Love-Letter to Bread, with Recipes
 2022 Charcuterie From Scratch

Awards
 2009 Guild of Food Writers 'New Media Award'. 
 2011 Guild of Food Writers 'Food Broadcast of the Year Award' 
 2012 Guild of Food Writers 'Best Food Magazine’ for Fire & Knives.
 2012 Guild of Food Writers 'Food Journalist of the Year' 
 2014 Fortnum & Mason Award for 'Best Food Journalism'
 2014 Guild of Food Writers 'Food Journalist of the Year'
 2015 Guild of Food Writers ‘Food Journalist of the Year’
 2018 Guild of Food Writers ‘Restaurant Writer of the Year’
 2022 Fortnum & Mason Award for 'Best Food Writer'

References

External links
 Guardian Word of Mouth: list of articles
 Financial Times writer's page
 Personal website
 Root + Bone Podcast. Tim Hayward Makes an Egg Mayonnaise Sandwich

1963 births
Living people
English male journalists
People educated at Bournemouth School
People educated at New College School
People educated at Bristol Grammar School
Alumni of Arts University Bournemouth